Unakan Ananta Norajaya (20 February 1856 – 29 March 1873) was a son of King Mongkut (Rama IV) and  consort Piam Sucharitakul.

He had the same parents as the three queens of King Chulalongkorn: Queen Sunandha Kumariratana, Queen Savang Vadhana and Queen Saovabha Bhongsi. Unakan Ananta Norajaya was the 29nd child of King Mongkut.

Prince Unakan Ananta Norajaya died on 29 March 1873 at the age 17.

Ancestors

References

Thai princes
19th-century Chakri dynasty
1856 births
1873 deaths
People from Bangkok
Thai male Phra Ong Chao
Children of Mongkut
Sons of kings